Boden is an Ortsgemeinde – a community belonging to a Verbandsgemeinde – in the Westerwaldkreis in Rhineland-Palatinate, Germany.

Geography

Location
The community lies north of Bundesautobahn 3, five kilometres from Montabaur. Through Boden's rural area flows the Ahrbach. The community belongs to the Verbandsgemeinde of Montabaur, a kind of collective municipality.

Neighbouring communities
Abutting Boden are, among others, Ruppach-Goldhausen, Heiligenroth, Moschheim, Niederahr and Meudt.

History
In 1211, Boden had its first documentary mention in the so-called , in which were written down the Trier Archbishops’ extensive holdings. The first chapel was built in 1716. The Church of the Assumption (Maria Himmelfahrt), built between 1914 and 1916 gives the village the look that it has today. An important rôle was played in Boden's development by clay quarrying, whose effects can clearly be seen all around Boden.

Religion
Ruppach-Goldhausen is the parish's main seat.

Politics

The municipal council is made up of 8 council members who were elected in a majority vote in a municipal election on 7 June 2009.

Culture and sightseeing

Music
The Big Band Boden e.V.  is known far beyond the bounds of the Westerwald and cheers concertgoers with a varied musical programme. From classic swing numbers (Count Basie, Duke Ellington, Glenn Miller and others) and vocal classics (Frank Sinatra, Dean Martin, Sammy Davis Jr., Michael Bublé) to soul, funk and pop classics, there is a broad programme on offer that has already entertained the 10,000 spectators at the Loreley.

Sport
The ASV Boden is the community's sport club, offering wrestling and gymnastics as sports.
The Sportfreunde Boden e.V. are active in the areas of table tennis, badminton and athletics.

Economy and infrastructure

Owing to its central location in western Germany and the well developed transport connections, Boden is easy to reach. Along the community runs Bundesstraße 255, linking Montabaur and Marburg. The nearest Autobahn interchange is Montabaur on the A 3 (Cologne–Frankfurt). The nearest InterCityExpress stop is the railway station at Montabaur on the Cologne-Frankfurt high-speed rail line. The Kannenbäckerstrasse links Boden to Neuhäusel and runs through the Kannenbäckerland.

References

External links
Boden 
Big Band Boden 

Municipalities in Rhineland-Palatinate
Westerwaldkreis